The Château de Soubeyran is a château in Saint-Barthélemy-Grozon, Ardèche, France. It was built for the de Soubeyran family, of which Hector de Soubeyran de Saint-Prix was a prominent member. It belongs to the Œuvres Laïques de l’Ardèche.

References

Châteaux in Ardèche